Allium materculae is a species of onion native to Turkey, Iran, and Russia.

References

materculae
Flora of Turkey
Flora of Iran
Flora of Russia
Plants described in 1915